The 2018–19 Quinnipiac Bobcats men's basketball team represented Quinnipiac University in the 2018–19 NCAA Division I men's basketball season. They played their home games at People's United Center in Hamden, Connecticut as members of the Metro Atlantic Athletic Conference, and were led by 2nd-year head coach Baker Dunleavy. They finished the 2018–19 season 16–15 overall, 11–7 in MAAC play to finish in a four-way tie for second place. As the No. 3 seed in the 2019 MAAC tournament, they were defeated by No. 6 seed Monmouth 92–98 in the quarterfinals. On March 13, 2019, they accepted an invitation to the CIT tournament, where they played NJIT in the opening round on March 18, 2019, losing 81–92.

Previous season
The Bobcats finished the 2017–18 season 12–21, 7–11 in MAAC play to finish in a tie for seventh place. As the No. 7 seed at the MAAC tournament, they defeated No. 10 seed Siena and upset No. 2 seed Canisius to advance to the semifinals, where they lost to No. 6 seed Fairfield.

Roster

Schedule and results

|-
!colspan=12 style=| Non-Conference Regular season

|-
!colspan=9 style=| MAAC regular season

|-
!colspan=12 style=| MAAC tournament
|-

|-
!colspan=12 style=|CollegeInsider.com Postseason tournament
|-

|-

References

Quinnipiac Bobcats men's basketball seasons
Quinnipiac Bobcats
Quinnipiac Bobcats men's basketball team
Quinnipiac Bobcats men's basketball team
Quinnipiac